Kegalu Vidyalaya is a boys' school in Kegalle, Sri Lanka. It was founded on 14 February 1942 and is a Government national school, providing primary and secondary education through 13 grades. It is the largest boys' School in Kegalle.

History 
The former Mudliar of Kegalle, D. M. Senevirathne, took the initiative in establishing a school in Kegalle for teaching English on a Buddhist basis.

The foundation stone laying ceremony took place on 20 August 1937 and construction of the school was completed by February 1942. A notice was issued by the principal of Ananda College, L. H. Meththananda, stating that Kegalu Vidyalaya would open on 14 February 1942 as a branch of Ananda College. The first edition of the school newspaper was published that month as well. In 2004 it was converted into a national school by President Chandrika Kumaratunga.

Houses 
The students are divided into four houses:

  – Dharmapala
  – Gunananda
  – Jayathilaka 
  – Olcott

The house names are derived from national heroes of Sri Lanka. The houses compete annually in games and sports to win an inter-house competition.

Battle of the Gold 
Kegalu Vidyalaya and St. Mary's College, Kegalle has been hosting an annual Big Match since 1960. It is said to be the oldest annual cricket match in Sri Lanka and is held annually in February or March as the official cricket team of both schools.

Notable alumni 
 Udayakantha Gunathilaka : Member of Parliament Sri Lanka (2020)
 Sumeda Ranasinghe : Sri Lankan javelin thrower (2016)

 Wiswa Warnapala: Member of Parliament, National List (2004-2010)
 Daya Sandagiri: Commander of the Navy (2000–2004)
 Sarath Chandrasiri Mayadunne: 36th Auditor General of Sri Lanka (2000–2006), Member of Parliament, National List (2015)

Notable staff 
 Bogoda Premaratne: one of the first teachers
 Dayananda Gunawardena Drama and theater teacher. (1957-1960)

References

External links 
 

Boys' schools in Sri Lanka
National schools in Sri Lanka
Buddhist schools in Sri Lanka
Schools in Kegalle
Educational institutions established in 1942
1942 establishments in Ceylon